Szegedi Vasutasok Sport Egyesülete is the Hungarian football club from the town of Szeged.

History
Szegedi Vasutasok Sport Egyesülete debuted in the 1941–42 season of the Hungarian League and finished fifteenth.

Name Changes 
1919–1941: Szegedi Vasutasok Sport Egyesülete
1941–1948: Tisza Vasutas SE
1948–1953: Szegedi Lokomotív SK
1953–1957: Szegedi Törekvés
1957–2007: Szegedi Vasutas SE
2007–2011: Szegedi VSE-Gyálarét
2011–present: Szegedi Vasutas SE

References

External links
 Profile

Football clubs in Hungary
1919 establishments in Hungary